The Rock Across Australia (TRAA) is a compilation of weekly Christian music charts according to the number of radio plays in Australia. 

TRAA published its first report on 15 February 1999. The chart listed the top 30 most played songs. It named Michael W Smith as Artist of the Year for 2002 and his track, "Purified", as Song of the Year. In March 2009 TRAA's researcher was Wes Jay.

References

External links

TRAA Website

Radio in Australia
Australian record charts